Faramarz Kola (also Romanized as Farāmarz Kolā) is a village in Sharq va Gharb-e Shirgah Rural District, North Savadkuh County, Mazandaran Province, Iran. At the 2006 census, its population was 561, in 143 families.

References 

Populated places in Savadkuh County